Jarrett Walter Payton (born December 26, 1980) is a former American football running back. He is the son of Walter Payton. Payton was previously signed as an undrafted free agent by the National Football League (NFL)'s Tennessee Titans. Payton also played for the Montreal Alouettes and Toronto Argonauts. Payton hosts his own internet radio show named the Jarrett Payton Show on ChicagolandSportsRadio.com.

Early years
Payton played high school soccer and football at St. Viator High School. In his first two years of high school, he opted for soccer and earned All-State player honors. As a senior in high school Payton accounted for 2,842 all-purpose yards while playing quarterback, tailback, and wide receiver (passed for 1,088 yards and rushed for another 1,345 yards). He was rated the No. 58 overall prospect in the nation by The Sporting News and named the No. 5 athlete in the Midwest Region by PrepStar.

College career
As a freshman at the University of Miami, Payton saw action in several games. He finished his freshman year with 262 yards rushing on 53 carries for a 4.9 average. He also totaled six catches for 48 yards (8.0 average) and returned two kickoffs for 44 yards. As a sophomore in college Payton sat out the season with a redshirt year (not medically related). As a third-year sophomore, moving to fullback from tailback, Payton played in eight games during the regular season and gained 26 yards on 14 carries with two touchdowns. In 2002, as a fourth year junior, he played extensively at tailback and as a starting kickoff return man (averaged 20.7 yards per kickoff return). At tailback he rushed for 223 yards on 50 carries (4.5 average). In his final year at the University of Miami Payton ran for 985 yards and seven touchdowns on 182 carries (5.4 average). He also caught 17 passes for 136 yards and one touchdown (8.0 average). He was also named the MVP of the 2004 Orange Bowl.

Professional career

National Football League
In 2005, he moved from the Titans to NFL Europe, where he played for the Amsterdam Admirals. He was a major part of the Admirals victory that year in the World Bowl XIII. He was also a member of the All-NFL Europe League team in 2005. Payton was the Titans third running back for the 2005 season, finishing the season with 33 carries for 105 yards and 2 touchdowns.

Payton was released prior to the 2006 season by the Titans during final cuts.

Canadian Football League
On February 22, 2007 it was announced that Payton had signed a one-year contract with the Montreal Alouettes of the CFL. He scored his first career CFL touchdown on August 2, 2007 against Toronto. Jarrett's first 100-yard rushing game came on August 9, 2007, when he rushed the ball 20 times for 160 yards and one touchdown against the Calgary Stampeders. Payton finished the season fifth in the CFL with 852 yards and fourth with eight rushing touchdowns. Payton was released by the Alouettes on July 2, 2008.

Payton signed with the Toronto Argonauts on June 7, 2009. He was released by the Argonauts, at his request, on September 9, 2009. During his time with the Argos he gained 47 all-purpose yards on three catches and seven carries. He announced that his desire was to continue work with the Chicago-based Walter & Connie Payton Foundation, which helps underprivileged children.

Personal
Payton is the son of Walter Payton, the former Chicago Bears running back great, and grew up in Arlington Heights, Illinois and South Barrington, Illinois. He has a sister, Brittney. In 1993, 12-year-old Jarrett gave the induction speech at his father's induction to the Pro Football Hall of Fame.

He wore jerseys numbered 33, 4 (Titans), and 34 (Miami). Payton chose 33 when he played with the Titans because #34 was retired in honor of Earl Campbell.  

Apart from playing football, Payton spends his time recording music. He married the former Trisha George on March 4, 2009 in Florida. The wedding date was intentionally set on this date to coincide with Walter Payton's famous #34 with the Bears.  They held their reception at Soldier Field in Chicago on March 7. The couple has two children, son Jaden and daughter Madison.

In 2011, Payton formed the Jarrett Payton Foundation. The Jarrett Payton Foundation strives to positively influence young people in and around Chicago through two core programs: the youth football camp The Jarrett Payton Leadership Academy, and the anti-bullying program PROJECT: NO BULL. Both programs are continually expanding.

On May 8, 2015, Payton was hired as a sports reporter by WGN-TV, which includes a role as a host of a show on Chicagoland Television.

Further reading
 Signing announcement at rds.ca.
 Chicago Tribune feature on Jarrett Payton signing with the Montreal Alouettes

References

External links

 Toronto Argonauts profile
 Jarrett Payton Studios
 Miami (Fla.) Hurricanes bio
 Jarrett Payton's profile on Walter Payton's website
 
 YouTube channel
 MySpace Music page
 Chicagoland Sports Radio, The Jarrett Payton Show

Jarrett
1980 births
Living people
African-American players of American football
African-American players of Canadian football
American football running backs
Amsterdam Admirals players
Canadian football running backs
Chicago Slaughter players
Miami Hurricanes football players
Montreal Alouettes players
People from Arlington Heights, Illinois
People from South Barrington, Illinois
Players of American football from Illinois
Sportspeople from Cook County, Illinois
Tennessee Titans players
Toronto Argonauts players